Neslia is a monotypic plant genus in the family Brassicaceae. The only extant species is Neslia paniculata

Neslia paniculata
Neslia paniculata (commonly called ball mustard) is a plant species in the family Brassicaceae. The name comes from the ball-shaped fruits that contain a single seed within an indehiscent fruit coat. It is an annual where the seeds germinate in autumn to winter and grow into a flattened rosette of leaves that develop vertical flowering stems in the spring. These can be up to 1 metre tall. The flowers open in late spring/early summer and the seeds are mature by summer. 

It is a native plant of temperate regions of Eurasia. It can also be found in much of the northern and southern regions of the Americas, Australia and also Britain. It is considered a weed in  many of these regions introduced from agricultural seed and can be a problem in cereal and especially other brassica crops. Its seed pods can contaminate harvests of mustard and rape/canola, even after cleaning. At the other end of the spectrum, within some its original region it has become a threatened or rare arable plant as a consequence of improved agricultural practices.

References

Brassicaceae
Monotypic Brassicaceae genera